HMCS Runnymede was a River-class frigate that served with the Royal Canadian Navy during the Second World War. She served primarily as a convoy escort in the Battle of the Atlantic.

Prince Rupert was ordered in June 1942 as part of the 1942–1943 River-class building program. She was laid down on 11 September 1943 by Canadian Vickers Ltd. at Montreal, Quebec and launched 27 November later that year. She was commissioned into the Royal Canadian Navy on 14 June 1944 at Montreal.

Background

The River-class frigate was designed by William Reed of Smith's Dock Company of South Bank-on-Tees. Originally called a "twin-screw corvette", its purpose was to improve on the convoy escort classes in service with the Royal Navy at the time, including the Flower-class corvette. The first orders were placed by the Royal Navy in 1940 and the vessels were named for rivers in the United Kingdom, giving name to the class. In Canada they were named for towns and cities though they kept the same designation. The name "frigate" was suggested by Vice-Admiral Percy Nelles of the Royal Canadian Navy and was adopted later that year.

Improvements over the corvette design included improved accommodation which was markedly better. For underwater targets, the River-class frigate was equipped with a Hedgehog anti-submarine mortar and depth charge rails aft and four side-mounted throwers.

River-class frigates were the first Royal Canadian Navy warships to carry the 147B Sword horizontal fan echo sonar transmitter in addition to the irregular ASDIC. This allowed the ship to maintain contact with targets even while firing unless a target was struck. Improved radar and direction-finding equipment improved the RCN's ability to find and track enemy submarines over the previous classes.

Canada originally ordered the construction of 33 frigates in October 1941. The design was too big for the shipyards on the Great Lakes so all the frigates built in Canada were built in dockyards along the west coast or along the St. Lawrence River. In all Canada ordered the construction of 60 frigates including ten for the Royal Navy that transferred two to the United States Navy.

War service
After working up at Bermuda, Runnymede was assigned to Mid-Ocean Escort Force escort group C-5. She was used as a trans-Atlantic convoy escort until May 1945 and as Senior Officer's Ship for the group. The group was known as the "Barber Pole Squadron" for the markings on their funnels.

Arriving at Halifax in June 1945 Runnymede was quickly turned around and set off for Esquimalt, British Columbia to undergo a tropicalization refit in preparation for service in the southern Pacific Ocean. This meant installing refrigeration, water-cooling and a change to her camouflage pattern. She commenced the refit in August 1945 at North Vancouver. However, due to the surrender of Japan, the refit was cancelled and Runnymede sailed to Esquimalt where she was placed in reserve and only paid off 19 January 1946.

After the war she was sold to Capital Iron & Metals Ltd. of Victoria, British Columbia for scrapping in 1947. Her hull was stripped and it was expended as a breakwater in Kelsey Bay, British Columbia.

References
Notes

References
Macpherson, Ken; Burgess, John. The ships of Canada's naval forces 1910–1981 : a complete pictorial history of Canadian warships. Collins: Toronto, 1981. 

River-class frigates of the Royal Canadian Navy
1943 ships